Libmanan is a railway station located on the South Main Line in Camarines Sur, Philippines. It is still use for the Bicol Express and Isarog Limited.

History
Libmanan was opened on February 3, 1929 as part of the expansion of the Legazpi Division Line from Tabaco, Albay to Libmanan, through passenger services to and from Manila commenced on January 31, 1938 after the Legazpi Division Line and Main Line South were merged into a continuous network called the Manila-Legazpi Line.

Philippine National Railways stations
Railway stations in Camarines Sur